Robert Vince (born April 1, 1962) is a Canadian director, producer, writer and screenwriter. He has been involved in movie production since the late 1980s and has been directing movies since 2000, such as MVP: Most Valuable Primate, the Air Buddies series, and Chestnut: Hero of Central Park.

Career
Vince, who hails from Vancouver, is CEO of Key Pix Productions and best known as the filmmaker behind family film franchises "Air Bud" and "Air Buddies". Vince has come to specialize in making films with children and animals. His directing credits include all of the "Air Buddies" franchise films, Santa Pups, Santa Paws, Chestnut, Spymate, MVP: Most Valuable Primate, Air Bud: Seventh Inning Fetch, MVP: Most Vertical Primate and MXP: Most Xtreme Primate. Before Vince launched his directing career, he ran Keystone Entertainment, where he produced, co-wrote and directed more than 33 films, primarily in partnership with Disney, Miramax and Warner Bros. Vince has two sons and splits his time between his two main offices in Malibu and Vancouver.

Personal life
Vince is the brother of William Vince, who was also a producer. Robert graduated Class of 1985 from Mount Allison University.

Filmography

Films

Television

References

External links

1962 births
Living people
Canadian male screenwriters
Film producers from British Columbia
Film directors from Vancouver
Writers from Vancouver